The 2018–19 Palestine Cup is the 2018–19 season of the top football cup in Palestine.

There are two competitions, the Gaza Strip Cup for clubs in the Gaza Strip, and the West Bank Cup for clubs in the West Bank. A two-legged Palestine Cup final is played between the cup winners of the Gaza Strip and the West Bank.

Gaza Strip Cup

Preliminary round

|-
!colspan=3|17 Dec 2018

|-
!colspan=3|18 Dec 2018

|}

Round of 32

|-
!colspan=3|23 Mar 2019

|-
!colspan=3|24 Mar 2019

|-
!colspan=3|25 Mar 2019

|-
!colspan=3|26 Mar 2019

|}

Round of 16

|-
!colspan=3|1 Apr 2019

|-
!colspan=3|2 Apr 2019

|}

Quarter-finals

|-
!colspan=3|8 Apr 2019

|-
!colspan=3|9 Apr 2019

|-
!colspan=3|11 Apr 2019

|}

Semi-finals

|-
!colspan=3|16 Apr 2019

|}

Final

|-
!colspan=3|22 Apr 2019

|}

West Bank Cup

Preliminary round 1

|-
!colspan=3|14 Dec 2018

|-
!colspan=3|15 Dec 2018

|-
!colspan=3|21 Dec 2018

|-
!colspan=3|24 Dec 2018

|-
!colspan=3|25 Dec 2018

|-
!colspan=3|28 Dec 2018

|}

Preliminary round 2

|-
!colspan=3|18 Dec 2018

|-
!colspan=3|21 Dec 2018

|-
!colspan=3|1 Jan 2019

|}

Round of 32

|-
!colspan=3|3 Feb 2019

|-
!colspan=3|4 Feb 2019

|-
!colspan=3|5 Feb 2019

|-
!colspan=3|11 Feb 2019

|-
!colspan=3|12 Feb 2019

|-
!colspan=3|20 Feb 2019

|}

Round of 16

|-
!colspan=3|8 Mar 2019

|-
!colspan=3|9 Mar 2019

|-
!colspan=3|18 May 2019

|}

Quarter-finals

|-
!colspan=3|17 May 2019

|-
!colspan=3|22 May 2019

|}

Semi-finals

|-
!colspan=3|25 May 2019

|-
!colspan=3|26 May 2019

|}

Final

|-
!colspan=3|1 Jun 2019

|}

Palestine Cup Final

The second leg was originally to be played on 3 July 2019. However, the match was postponed after Israel denied permits for all but 4 of Khadamat Rafah's players to travel to the West Bank, reportedly due to security concerns. In September 2019, the game was cancelled entirely after the decision by the Coordinator of Government Activities in the Territories (COGAT) was upheld by a court.

See also
2018–19 West Bank Premier League
2018–19 Gaza Strip Premier League

References

Palestine Cup
Palestine
Cup